The dwarf brocket (Mazama chunyi), or chunyi, is a small species of deer native to the Andean highlands in western Bolivia and southeastern Peru, where it is found in forest and páramo. Its pelage is reddish-brown with dark grey foreparts and neck. The underparts are lighter brown, and the muzzle short and thick. It weighs around 11 kg.

A little-studied species of brocket deer, the IUCN considers the dwarf brocket as Vulnerable. Research has occurred in the forests of Bolivia, expanding known localities and modelling geographic distribution; while as much as 40% of the habitat was degraded or fragmented, the rest showed good conservation. This led to the recommendation of treating it as Vulnerable.

References

Mazama (genus)
Mammals of the Andes
Mammals of Bolivia
Mammals of Peru
Páramo fauna
Mammals described in 1959
Yungas